Adrian Tam (born September 11, 1992) is an American politician serving as a member of the Hawaii House of Representatives. He is a member of the Hawaii affiliate of the Democratic Party.

Early life
Tam is a second-generation Asian American of Taiwanese ancestry. His father had served as an assistant to a draftsman, and his mother worked in sales. Following graduation from Kalani High School, he graduated with a degree in history from Pennsylvania State University, and upon returning to Hawaii, began working for his family's real estate company.

Political career
Tam worked for the Hawaii Senate before running for public office in 2020. He defeated incumbent Tom Brower in the Democratic Party primary election, then won the general election for the 22nd district of the Hawaii House of Representatives against Republican Party candidate Nicholas Ochs, who previously served as the vice chairman of Donald Trump's Hawaii campaign in the 2016 United States elections, had strong support from Roger Stone and drew media attention for founding the Hawaii chapter of the Proud Boys. After Tam was seated, he became the only openly gay member of the Hawaii State Legislature.

Following the 2021 storming of the United States Capitol, Tam and other Hawaii lawmakers signed a letter requesting rioters to be placed on the federal No Fly List.

Tam is a member of the Progressive Legislative Caucus.

Personal life

Tam lives with his dog, Winston.

Awards and honors

In June 2021, Queerty named Tam one of its "Pride50" people "who made a positive impact in the last year and who are helping to lead the nation toward equality, acceptance, and dignity for all queer people".

Electoral history

Notes

References

Living people
1992 births
21st-century American politicians
21st-century American LGBT people
American politicians of Hong Kong descent
American politicians of Taiwanese descent
American real estate brokers
Gay politicians
Hawaii politicians of Chinese descent
American LGBT people of Asian descent
LGBT state legislators in Hawaii
Democratic Party members of the Hawaii House of Representatives
Pennsylvania State University alumni